Bishop Monkton is a village and civil parish in the Harrogate district of North Yorkshire, England, about five miles south of Ripon.  According to the 2001 census it had a population of 775, increasing slightly to 778 at the 2011 Census. In 2015, North Yorkshire County Council estimated the population to be 760.

Main features of the village include a beck which runs through the centre of the village, two churches (St John the Baptist [C of E] and a Methodist church), a newly built village hall and playing fields, a primary school, two pubs and two caravan sites.

It is within easy reach of Ripon and Harrogate (via the A61). Leeds and York are both less than an hour's drive.

Littlethorpe and Burton Leonard are the nearest villages.

History 
The settlement is mentioned in the Domesday Book as belonging to the then Archbishop of York. The name Monucheton predates the survey (listed in 1030) as the Town of the monks.

Twentieth century developments include a council estate built in the 1960s, and two more housing estates built at the south-eastern tip of the village. In 1986 a rural area to the east of the village, Bishop Monkton Ings, was designated a Site of Special Scientific Interest (SSSI) by Natural England. To the west of the village lies Bishop Monkton Railway Cutting Nature Reserve, which is managed by the Yorkshire Wildlife Trust.

The village has a church, St John the Baptist, a grade II listed structure that was built in 1878. The nearby primary school is also located on St John's Road and has been rated Good by Ofsted in 2006, 2009 and 2013.

Bishop Monkton Beck runs eastwards through the middle of the village on its way to the River Ure.

Governance
An electoral ward in the same name exists. This ward stretches to the north, south and east of the parish with a total population taken at the 2011 census of 2,842.

References

Sources

External links 

Bishop Monkton Website – Maintained by Richard Field

Villages in North Yorkshire
Civil parishes in North Yorkshire